KJPZ is a radio station broadcasting a Christian format. Licensed to East Helena, Montana, the station is owned by Hi-Line Radio Fellowship, Inc., and broadcasts its network Your Network of Praise.

The station was assigned the call sign KAPM by the Federal Communications Commission on July 24, 1985. The station changed its call sign to KZKY on February 5, 1986, to KHKR-FM on August 22, 1988, and to KBMI-FM on July 11, 2013.

In 2014, "B104" moved from a Hot AC to Mainstream CHR and had a change of personnel with the addition of The Montana Mayhem with Matty D and Big T to Mornings, Katie Cruise to Middays, The Northern Light Show with Nick Northern in the PM Drive and Kramer's Big Dumb Fun Show is the night show.

On April 5, 2017, Montana Radio Company announced that it would acquire Cherry Creek Media's Helena stations. To comply with ownership limits, KBMI-FM was divested to Hi-Line Radio Fellowship, Inc., who flipped the station to their Your Network of Praise network. The acquisition was consummated on July 28, 2017.

The station changed its call sign to the current KJPZ on June 18, 2018.

References

External links
KJPZ tower and transmitter photos

JPZ
Hot adult contemporary radio stations in the United States
Lewis and Clark County, Montana
Radio stations established in 1996
1996 establishments in Montana